This is a list of notable present and former faculty, staff, and students of the University of California, Los Angeles (UCLA).

Notable alumni

Nobel laureates

 Ralph Bunche – recipient of the 1950 Nobel Peace Prize
 Richard F. Heck – recipient of the 2010 Nobel Prize in Chemistry 
 Robert Bruce Merrifield – recipient of the 1984 Nobel Prize in Chemistry 
 Elinor Ostrom – recipient of the 2009 Nobel Memorial Prize in Economic Sciences 
Ardem Patapoutian - recipient of the 2021 Nobel Prize in Medicine
 Randy Schekman – recipient of the 2013 Nobel Prize in Medicine 
 Glenn T. Seaborg – recipient of the 1951 Nobel Prize in Chemistry 
 William F. Sharpe – recipient of the 1990 Nobel Memorial Prize in Economic Sciences
 Andrea Ghez - recipient of the 2020 Nobel Prize in Physics

Academia, science and technology

Arts and literature

 Amy Adler – artist
 Luis Aguilar-Monsalve – writer and educator
 Sara Kathryn Arledge – artist
 Catherine Asaro – Nebula Award-winning science-fiction novelist
 Glenna Avila – artist
 James Robert Baker – novelist
 Gary Baseman – artist
 Edith Baumann – abstract artist
 Rosa Beltrán – writer, lecturer and academic
 Guy Bennett – writer, translator and educator
 Susan Berman – author and screenwriter
 Stan Bitters – sculptor
 Justina Blakeney – designer and author
 Slater Bradley – artist
 Kenneth Wayne Bushnell – artist and educator
 Jan Butterfield – art writer and educator
 Vija Celmins – artist
 Judy Chicago – artist and educator
 Vicky A. Clark – curator
 Coleman Collins – artist
 Jennifer Dalton – artist
 Agnes de Mille – dancer and choreographer
 Jacques Ehrmann – literary theorist
 Dan Eldon – photojournalist
 Warren Farrell – educator, gender equality activist and author of The Myth of Male Power
 Alyce Frank – artist
 Martin Friedman – former director of Walker Art Center
 Charles Garabedian – artist
 Kelly Grovier – poet and literary critic
 Kim Gruenenfelder – author
 Sam Harris – writer
 Florence Parry Heide – author of children's literature
 Juan Felipe Herrera – professor, 21st U.S. poet laureate
 Gilah Yelin Hirsch – artist
 Diane Johnson – novelist
 Jane Jin Kaisen  – artist
 Craig Kauffman – artist
 Jonathan Kellerman – Edgar Award-winning novelist and psychologist
 Toba Khedoori - painter
 Annie Lapin – painter
 Mitchell Landsberg – journalist
 Gaylord Larsen – mystery writer
 Russell Leong – author and philosopher of Asian-American studies
 Linda Levi – artist
 Dave McNary – entertainment journalist
 Edward Meshekoff – artist
 Meleko Mokgosi – artist
 Ed Moses – artist
 Alexandra Nechita – painter
 John D. Nesbitt – writer and educator
 Tameka Norris – artist
 Flo Perkins – glass artist
 Raymond Pettibon – visual artist, known for creating the cover art for punk-rock band Black Flag's albums
 Jenelle Porter – art curator and author
 Jason Rhoades – artist
 Kay Ryan – poet and educator; U.S. Poet Laureate (2008–2010); MacArthur Fellow (2011)
 Betye Saar – artist
 Ben Sakoguchi – artist
 Shizu Saldamando – artist
 Sarah Seager – artist
 Cindy Shih – artist
 Jan Stussy (1921–1990) – artist
 Wu Tsang – artist
 Billie Tsien – architect, Barack Obama Presidential Center
 Harry Turtledove – Hugo Award and Nebula Award-winning science-fiction novelist
 Barbara Brooks Wallace – award-winning children's author, including two Edgar Awards and a William Allen White Children's Book Award
* Emma Walton Hamilton (UCLA Lab School) – actress, author of children's book
 Idelle Weber – artist
 Antoine Wilson – novelist
 Jan Wurm – artist
Richard Wyatt Jr. – artist

Film, television and theater

Athletics

Hall of Famers in major team sports

National Baseball Hall of Fame
 Jackie Robinson (inducted in 1962)

Pro Football Hall of Fame
 Bob Waterfield (inducted in 1965)
 Tom Fears (inducted in 1970)
 Jimmy Johnson (inducted in 1994)
 Troy Aikman (inducted in 2006)
 Jonathan Ogden (inducted in 2013)
 Kenny Easley (inducted in 2017)

Naismith Memorial Basketball Hall of Fame

Baseball

Basketball

American football / Gridiron

Golf

John Merrick – professional golfer
Corey Pavin – professional golfer, 1995 U.S. Open champion, 2010 Ryder Cup captain
Tom Pernice Jr. – professional golfer
Monte Scheinblum – 1992 U.S. National and World Long Drive Champion
Duffy Waldorf – professional golfer

Gymnastics

Association football / soccer

Tennis

 Arthur Ashe (1943–1993) – tennis player (ranked as high as # 1) and social activist; Wimbledon champion and member of the International Tennis Hall of Fame
 Jimmy Connors (born 1952) – tennis player (ranked as high as # 1); two-time Wimbledon champion and member of the International Tennis Hall of Fame
 Herbert Flam (1928–1980) – tennis player (ranked as high as # 4)
 Zack Fleishman (born 1980) – professional tennis player
 Allen Fox (born 1939) – tennis player (ranked as high as # 4) and coach
 Mike Franks (born 1936) – professional tennis player
 Justin Gimelstob (born 1977) – professional tennis player
 Julius Heldman (1919-2006) - professional tennis player was the National Junior Tennis Champion in 1936 
Anita Kanter (born 1933) – tennis player ranked in world top 10
Tom Karp (born 1946) - tennis player
 Jeff Klaparda (born 1963) - professional tennis player won the 1984 USTA National Amateur Clay Courts title 
Steve Krulevitz (born 1951) – professional tennis player
 Kimberly Po – professional tennis player
 Brian Teacher (born 1954) – professional tennis player (ranked as high as # 7); Australian Open champion; and coach
 Eliot Teltscher (born 1959) – professional tennis player (ranked as high as # 6)
 Van Winitsky (born 1959) - professional tennis player ranked as high as # 7 in doubles

Track and field

 Evelyn Ashford – Olympic track and field athlete and multiple gold medalist
 Ato Boldon – Olympic track and field athlete 1997 200 meter World Champion and four-time Olympic Sprint medalist
 Gail Devers – track and field runner; multiple Olympic gold medalist
 Danny Everett – Olympic bronze medalist in track and field
 Millard Hampton – track and field athlete, gold (4X100 relay) and silver (200 meters) medalist in the 1976 Montreal Olympics
 Dawn Harper – 2008 Olympics 100m Hurdles gold medalist
 Joanna Hayes – Olympic gold medalist track and field 100 m hurdles record holder
 Monique Henderson – track and field runner; Olympic gold medalist in 4 × 400 m relay
 Rafer Johnson – several-time world-record holder in the decathlon, and gold medalist at the 1960 Summer Olympics
 Florence Griffith Joyner – Olympic gold medalist and world record holder in 100 meter race
 Jackie Joyner-Kersee – track and field athlete, multiple Olympic gold medalist and world record holder in the heptathlon
 Meb Keflezighi – Olympic silver medalist, NCAA championships and New York City Marathon winner
 Steve Lewis – Olympic gold medalist in track and field
 Andre Phillips – track and field athlete, 400 meter hurdle gold medalist in the 1988 Seoul Olympics
 Mike Powell – former track and field athlete, current coach and holder of the long jump world record
* Yang Chuan-kwang (also known as C.K. Yang) – former world-record holder in the decathlon, silver medalist in the decathlon in the 1960 Summer Olympics; first man to score over 9,000 points (using the tables at the time)

 Kevin Young – Olympic gold medalist in track and field, current world record holder 400 meters hurdles

Volleyball

Karch Kiraly – volleyball player and coach; only person to win Olympic gold medals in both indoor and beach volleyball
Holly McPeak – beach volleyball player and Olympic bronze medalist
Elaine Youngs – beach volleyball player and Olympic bronze medalist

Water polo

James Ferguson – 1972 Olympic bronze medalist, USA Water Polo Hall of Fame
Natalie Golda – water polo player; Olympian
Adam Krikorian – water polo player and coach; won 14 national titles
 Jillian Kraus (born 1986) - water polo player
Monte Nitzkowski – Olympic water polo coach and swimmer
 Josh Samuels (born 1991) - Olympic water polo player 
Jovan Vavic - former head coach of the USC men's and women's water polo teams

Other

 Glenn Cowan (1952–2004) - table tennis player
Lisa Fernandez – Olympic softball gold medalist
Brian Goodell – swimmer; nine NCAA individual championships, two-time Olympic champion, and former world record-holder
Tommy Kendall – race car driver and television analyst
 Erwin Klein (d. 1992) - table tennis player
Dan Kutler – Olympic swimmer
Michelle Kwan – world champion figure skater; record nine-time U.S. National Champion
Ken Pavia – former sports agent, founder of MMAagents Sports Agency, and the former CEO of India's first MMA Promotion Super Fight League
Dot Richardson – softball player, Olympic gold medalist
Mark Schultz (attended), 3x NCAA Champion, Olympic and world champion wrestler
Doug Shaffer – platform diving, U.S. National champion, NCAA Diver of the Year, Head coach at UCLA, Minnesota and LSU
Tim Thackrey – US National Team and Pan Am Games gold medalist

Business and law

Nancy J. Adler – Professor of Organizational Behavior and Samuel Bronfman Chair in Management at McGill University
Eugene Anderson – attorney
Shawn Holley – member of O. J. Simpson murder case defense team 
Fred D. Anderson – former CFO of Apple Computer
John Edward Anderson – president of Topa Equities, Ltd.; namesake of UCLA Anderson School of Management
Tom Anderson – founder of MySpace
Nancy Austin – management consultant and author of The Assertive Woman
Stephen F. Bollenbach – CEO of Hilton Hotels Corporation
Saul Brandman (1925–2008) – garment manufacturer
Bernard Briskin – co-founder and Chairman of Gelson's Markets
Janice Rogers Brown – judge for the D.C. Circuit Court of Appeals
Vincent Bugliosi – attorney and writer
Michael Burry – hedge fund manager
Frieda Rapoport Caplan – Entrepreneur in Specialty Produce
Cormac J. Carney – United States federal judge
Phil Carter – attorney, writer, and U.S. Army adviser in Iraq
Morgan Chu – attorney, intellectual property expert
Frank Chuman – attorney and author
Marcia Clark – attorney, lead prosecutor in O. J. Simpson murder case
Johnnie Cochran – attorney
Leslie Abramson- attorney, best known for the defense of Erik Menendez
Jeff Cohen – entertainment lawyer best known for work as child actor in The Goonies (1985)
Lynn Compton – former judge for the California Court of Appeals and served as a commissioned officer with E Company, 2nd Battalion, 506th Parachute Infantry Regiment, in the 101st Airborne Division of the United States Army
Roger Curtis – founder of Associated Electrics
Keith Fink – attorney
Laurence D. Fink – CEO and Chairman of BlackRock
Dolly Gee – U.S. District Court judge
Bill Gross – co-founder of PIMCO; philatelist
Vinita Gupta – first Indian-origin woman to take her company public
Horace Hahn – assisted Justice Robert H. Jackson as an interrogator in the prosecution of Nazi war criminals at the Nuremberg Trials
Sam Hamadeh – co-founder, Vault.com
John W. Henry – money manager and principal owner of the Boston Red Sox and Liverpool F.C.
Nita Ing – chairman of Continental Engineering Corporation and Taiwan High Speed Rail
William R. Johnson – chief executive officer, H.J. Heinz Company
Alex Kozinski – judge for the Ninth Circuit Court of Appeals
Ryan Lee – hedge fund manager and radio commentator
Hardy McLain (born 1952) – hedge fund manager; managing partner of CVC Capital Partners
Billy G. Mills – Los Angeles City Council member, 1963–74, Superior Court judge thereafter
Marvin Mitchelson – attorney
Irwin Molasky – real estate entrepreneur and early developer of Las Vegas
Ezri Namvar – former founder and chairman of Namco Capital Group
Dorothy W. Nelson – senior judge for the Ninth Circuit Court of Appeals
Michael Newdow – plaintiff in Supreme Court case that challenged the constitutionality of the Pledge of Allegiance
Robert C. O'Brien, United States National Security Advisor
Michael Ovitz – Hollywood power broker and former president of the Walt Disney Company
Robert O. Peterson – founder of the Jack in the Box restaurant chain
Daniel Petrocelli – attorney
Harry Pregerson – judge for the Ninth Circuit Court of Appeals
Donald Prell – venture capitalist, author and futurist
Subramaniam Ramadorai – chief executive officer and managing director, Tata Consultancy Services
Jennifer Rodgers, former United States Attorney for the Southern District of New York and CNN legal analyst
Nobutada Saji – chief executive officer, Suntory
Robert Shapiro – attorney, part of defense team in O. J. Simpson murder case
Sanford C. Sigoloff – businessman and philanthropist
 Stacey Snider – president of DreamWorks
 Ronald Sugar – chief executive officer, Northrop Grumman
 Jay Sures – co-president of United Talent Agency
 Edward Tabash – Constitutional attorney specializing in church and state issues; Board of Directors for the Center for Inquiry
 Robert Mitsuhiro Takasugi – federal judge
 A. Wallace Tashima – judge for the Ninth Circuit Court of Appeals
Steven F. Udvar-Hazy – founder, chairman and CEO of ILFC
Kim McLane Wardlaw – judge for the Ninth Circuit Court of Appeals
Surangel Whipps Jr. - President of the Republic of Palau (2021 - Present)
Don Yee – NFL sports agent
James Yenbamroong – space entrepreneur and founder of Mu Space
Ken Ziffren (J.D. 1965) – entertainment attorney, L.A.'s film czar (2014–present)

Music

 Jenni Alpert – singer-songwriter
 Sara Bareilles – Grammy Award-winning singer-songwriter and pianist
 Jan Berry – singer-songwriter; member of the rock-and-roll duo Jan & Dean
 Jeff Blue – music producer for various labels; vice president of Warner California's artists-and-repertoire division
 Alison Brown – Grammy Award-winning banjo player
 John Cage – composer; student of Schoenberg
 Don Davis – film-score composer, including the science-fiction action film franchise The Matrix trilogy (1999, 2003 and 2003)
 Brad Delson – guitarist; lead guitarist and founding member of the Grammy Award-winning rock band Linkin Park
 Ryan Dusick – drummer, member of the Grammy Award-winning pop-rock band Maroon 5
 Doriot Anthony Dwyer – principal flautist, Boston Symphony Orchestra
 Blake McIver Ewing − singer, pianist, actor
 John Fahey – experimental guitarist
 Jill Gibson – singer-songwriter, photographer, painter and sculptor
 Greg Ginn – guitarist and singer-songwriter; guitarist of the punk-rock band Black Flag
 Kim Gordon – musician; member of the alternative-rock band Sonic Youth
 Greg Graffin – singer-songwriter; lead singer of the punk-rock band Bad Religion
 Conan Gray – singer-songwriter;youtuber
 Joshua Guerrero, operatic tenor
 Este Haim, — member of Grammy nominated sister band HAIM.
 Jake Heggie – opera composer, Dead Man Walking
 Marilyn Horne – mezzo-soprano opera singer
 James Horner – Academy Award, Golden Globe Award, and Grammy Award-winning film-score composer
 Anthony Kiedis – singer-songwriter; lead vocalist of the alternative-rock band Red Hot Chili Peppers
 Jim Lindberg – singer-songwriter; lead singer of the punk-rock band Pennywise
Jon MacLennan – session musician and author of Melodic Expressions: The Art of the Line (2012)
 Mickey Madden –  bass guitarist of the Grammy Award-winning pop-rock band Maroon 5
 Ron Mael – musician and songwriter; co-founder (with brother Russell Mael) and keyboardist of the pop-rock band Sparks
 Russell Mael – singer-songwriter; co-founder (with brother Ron Mael) and lead vocalist of the pop-rock band Sparks
 Ray Manzarek – co-founder and keyboardist of the rock band The Doors
 Maile Misajon – singer-songwriter; former member of the pop girl group Eden's Crush
 Jim Morrison – poet and singer-songwriter; co-founder and lead vocalist of rock band The Doors
 Randy Newman – composer, pianist and singer-songwriter; Academy Award, Emmy Award and Grammy Award-winning film-score composer (dropped out one semester short of a B.A. in music)
 NS Yoon-G, stage name of Christine Kim, aka Kim Yoonji – South Korean singer 
 John Ondrasik – singer-songwriter; performs pop rock under the stage name Five for Fighting
 Mo Ostin – music executive, Chairman Emeritus of Warner Bros. Records
 Kira Roessler – musician and film and television dialogue editor; bass guitarist of the punk-rock band Black Flag; film and television work includes Primetime Emmy Award-winning dialogue editor for her work on the biographical television miniseries John Adams (2008) episode "Don't Tread On Me"
 Laura Roppé – singer-songwriter and writer; cancer survivor who wrote memoir Rocking the Pink: Finding Myself on the Other Side of Cancer
* Seo Jung-kwon – Korean-American rapper under the stage name Tiger JK, and leader of hip hop group Drunken Tiger
 Andy Sturmer – singer-songwriter and drummer of Jellyfish, producer for Puffy AmiYumi, composer of theme songs for Ben 10 and Teen Titans
 Paul Tanner – member of the Glenn Miller Orchestra, inventor of the Electro-Theremin instrument
 David Tao – singer
 Brian Tyler – BAFTA-nominated film score composer, conductor and film producer; his compositions include scores for Iron Man 3, Thor: The Dark World, and Frank Herbert's Children of Dune
 Kamasi Washington – jazz saxophonist, composer, producer and bandleader
 John Williams – Academy Award, Emmy Award and Grammy Award-winning composer; conductor and pianist; compositions include scores for the space opera Star Wars film series
 La Monte Young – composer, leading figure in musical minimalism

Politics

 Shahid Khaqan Abbasi – Prime Minister of Pakistan 
 Farid Abboud – ambassador of Lebanon to United States
 Senu Abdul Rahman – former Member of the Malaysian Parliament, Malaysia's first Minister of Information
 Glenn M. Anderson – United States Representative from California (1969–1993)
 Patrick Argüello – Nicaraguan-American revolutionary
 Howard Berman – member of the U.S. House of Representatives
 Tom Bradley – Mayor of Los Angeles (1973–1993)
 Yvonne Braithwaite Burke – Los Angeles County Supervisor
 John Campbell – member of the U.S. House of Representatives
 Benjamin Cayetano – Governor of Hawaii (1994–2002)
 Judy Chu – first Chinese-American woman ever elected to the U.S. Congress
 James C. Corman – Los Angeles City Council member; member of the U.S. House of Representatives
 J. Curtis Counts – director, Federal Mediation and Conciliation Service
 Edmund D. Edelman – Los Angeles City Council member (1965–1974); Los Angeles County Board of Supervisors member (1975–1994)
 John Ehrlichman – assistant and counsel to the Richard M. Nixon presidential administration
 Elizabeth Emken – 2012 Republican U.S. Senate Candidate
 Robert C. Farrell – journalist; Los Angeles City Council member (1974–1991)
 Dean Florez – member of the California State Senate, student body president at UCLA
 Kirsten Gillibrand – U.S. Senator from New York
 H.R. Haldeman – Chief of Staff for the Richard M. Nixon presidential administration; a key figure in the Watergate scandal
 James Day Hodgson – former United States Secretary of Labor and Ambassador to Japan
 Andrei Iancu - Director of the United States Patent and Trademark Office
 Paul Koretz – former member of the California State Assembly; Los Angeles City Council member
 Sheila Kuehl – former member of the California State Senate, California State Assembly, and current Los Angeles County Board of Supervisors 
 Jerry Lewis – member of the U.S. House of Representatives, Chairman of the U.S. House Committee on Appropriations
 Calum MacDonald – former Member of Parliament in the United Kingdom
 Roberto Madrazo – candidate for president of Mexico in the 2006 presidential elections
 Jim Matheson – member of the U.S. House of Representatives for Utah
 Tom McClintock – member of the U.S. House of Representatives
 David McReynolds – activist and socialist political candidate
 Lloyd Monserratt – California political and community leader
 Bill Morrow – member of the California State Senate
 Gordon L. Park – former member of the Wyoming House of Representatives
 Dennis Ross – U.S. diplomat to the Middle East
 Edward R. Roybal – member of the U.S. House of Representatives
 Brad Sherman – member of the U.S. House of Representatives
 Helen Singleton – civil rights activist and Freedom Rider
 William French Smith – former United States Attorney General
 Todd Spitzer – member of the California State Assembly
 William R. Steiger – director, U.S. Department of Health and Human Services's Office of Global Health Affairs in the George W. Bush administration
 Ted Stevens – former senator of Alaska and alumnus to Delta Kappa Epsilon
 Rick Tuttle – Freedom Rider and Los Angeles City Controller
 Peggy Stevenson – Los Angeles City Council member (1975–1985)
 Antonio Villaraigosa – Mayor of Los Angeles; former Speaker of the California Assembly
 Joel Wachs – Los Angeles City Council member (1970–2001); president of the Andy Warhol Foundation for the Visual Arts in New York City
 Mimi Walters – member of the U.S. House of Representatives
 Diane Watson – member of the U.S. House of Representatives
 Henry Waxman – member of the U.S. House of Representatives
 Shirley Weber – Secretary of State of California
 Harold Willens – Jewish American businessman, political donor, nuclear freeze activist
 Helena Wong – member of the Legislative Council of Hong Kong, lecturer at Hong Kong Polytechnic University
 Cheng Siwei - former Vice Chairman of the Standing Committee of the National People's Congress of the People's Republic of China
 Zev Yaroslavsky (born 1948) – Los Angeles City Council member; Los Angeles County Board of Supervisors member
Ehsan Zaffar – author; faculty; senior advisor on civil right,– U.S. Dept. of Homeland Security

Miscellaneous

 Rodney Alcala – convicted rapist and serial killer active from 1968 to 1979, aka the "Dating Game Killer" for his successful appearance on The Dating Game
 Gustavo Arellano – OC Weekly writer and author of the "¡Ask a Mexican!" column
 Jules Asner – model and television personality
 Tony Auth – Pulitzer Prize–winning political cartoonist
 Rudi Bakhtiar – national news anchor
 Tony Blankley – commentator on The McLaughlin Group
 Joseph Blatchford – third Director of the United States Peace Corps
 Barbara Branden – author, Who is Ayn Rand?
 Nathaniel Branden – psychologist, author, Who is Ayn Rand?, Psychology of Self-Esteem and Judgment Day
 Judge Joe Brown – television judge
 Linda Burhansstipanov – Cherokee Nation of Oklahoma member, public health educator and researcher focused on Native American cancer care and support
 William George Carr – Executive Secretary of the National Education Association, 1952–1967
 Carlos Castaneda – anthropologist and writer
 Paul Colichman – founder of Here! cable TV network
 Allen Cunningham – professional poker player
 Iva Toguri D'Aquino – World War II radio propagandist, "Tokyo Rose"
 Giada De Laurentiis – Food Network Chef (Every Day Italian)
 Clifford B. Drake - Marine Corps Major general
 Chris "Jesus" Ferguson – World Series of Poker main event winner and poker professional
 Harvey J. Fields – Reform rabbi.
 Alice Taylor Gafford – artist
 Vanessa Getty - socialite and philanthropist
 Jonathan Gold – Pulitzer Prize-winning food critic
 Kelly Goto –  User experience design researcher and author of "Web Redsign, Workflow that Works."
 Josh E. Gross – publisher of Beverly Hills Weekly
 Todd Harris – Republican strategist on Hardball with Chris Matthews
 Frank B. James – U.S. Air Force general
 Arthur Janov – psychologist, inventor of primal therapy
 Stephen Francis Jones – American architect known for high-end restaurant designs
 Kang Dong-suk – yachtsman, first Korean solo circumnavigator
 Jill Kinmont – educator, quadriplegic, alpine ski racer in the 1950s
 Ida B. Kinney – civil rights activist
 Ezra Klein – blogger; journalist, Vox.com
 Ralph Lazo – civil rights activist, only known non-spouse and non-Japanese American who voluntarily relocated to a World War II Japanese American internment camp
 Flora Lewis – journalist with The New York Times
 Carol Lin – national news anchor
 Laura Ling – journalist with Current TV, notable for her detainment in North Korea
 Bridget Marquardt – co-star of The Girls Next Door
 Nana Meriwether – Miss Maryland USA 2012, Miss USA 2012
 Donn Moomaw – Presbyterian minister, member of the College Football Hall of Fame
 K. Patrick Okura – Japanese American psychologist and civil rights activist
 Zoltan Pali – architect
 Steve Parode – U. S. Navy Rear Admiral
 William R. Peers – U.S. Army Lt. General best known for leading the army's investigation of the My Lai incident
 Kelly Perdew – winner of The Apprentice
 Brian R. Price – author, editor, publisher, martial-arts instructor of the Italian school of swordsmanship, reconstructive armorer, and dissertation fellow in history at the University of North Texas
 Lila Rose – activist and president of Live Action
 Steve Sailer – paleoconservative blogger and journalist (VDARE, Taki's Magazine)
 James M. Seely – U.S. Navy rear admiral and acting Assistant Secretary of the Navy (Financial Management and Comptroller) from December 18, 1988 to January 1990
 Ben Shapiro - conservative commentator for The Daily Wire
 Marcus Stern – Pulitzer Prize-winning journalist
 Alan S. Thompson – retired U.S. Navy vice admiral
 Daniel Thompson – inventor of the automatic bagel maker and the folding ping pong table
 Princess Ubol Ratana of Thailand
 Francis B. Wai – Medal of Honor recipient
 J. Warner Wallace – homicide detective and Christian apologist
 Stephen Worth – director of the ASIFA-Hollywood Animation Archive Project
 Prince Chatri Chalerm Yukol of Thailand
 Kelly, Hereditary Princess of Saxe-Coburg and Gotha

Notable faculty

Nobel laureates

 Paul D. Boyer – professor of chemistry; recipient of the 1997 Nobel Prize in Chemistry
 Donald Cram (1919–2001) – professor of chemistry; recipient of the 1987 Nobel Prize in Chemistry
 Louis J. Ignarro – professor of molecular and medical pharmacology; recipient of the 1998 Nobel Prize in Medicine
 Willard Libby (1908–1980) – professor of chemistry; recipient of the 1960 Nobel Prize in Chemistry
 Bertrand Russell (1872–1970) – mathematician and philosopher; recipient of the 1950 Nobel Prize in Literature
 Julian Schwinger (1918–1994) – professor of physics; recipient of the 1965 Nobel Prize in Physics
 Lloyd Shapley – professor of economics; recipient of the 2012 Nobel Prize in Economics 
 Andrea M. Ghez - American astrophysicist and professor in the Department of Physics and Astronomy. In 2020, she became the fourth woman to be awarded the Nobel Prize in Physics

Administrators

 Ernest Carroll Moore, 1919–1936
 Earle Raymond Hedrick, 1937–1942
 Clarence Addison Dykstra, 1945–1950
 Raymond B. Allen, 1951–1959, First chancellor
 Vern Oliver Knudsen, 1959–1960
 Franklin David Murphy, 1960–1968
 Charles E. Young, 1968–1997
 Albert Carnesale, 1997–2006
 Norman Abrams, 2006–2007
 Gene D. Block, 2007–present

Business

Mark A.R. Kleiman – professor of public policy, noted expert on crime and drug policy
Paul Habibi - professor of real estate and finance at UCLA Anderson School of Management
Richard Riordan - professor of business at UCLA Anderson School of Management 
William Ouchi – professor of management and best-selling author

Law

Medicine

Michael S. Gottlieb – first physician to diagnose AIDS
Roberta Gottlieb - oncologist
David Ho – AIDS researcher
Howard Judd – menopause expert and medical researcher
Martha Kirkpatrick (1925–2015) – clinical professor of psychiatry
Kimberly J. Lee – reconstructive surgeon 
Linda Liau – W. Eugene Stern Chair of the Department of Neurosurgery
Courtney Lyder – expert in gerontology; first black dean of the UCLA School of Nursing 
No-Hee Park, DMD, PhD – Dean, UCLA School of Dentistry and notable researcher of oral (head and neck) cancer and aging research
Patrick Soon-Shiong – executive director, UCLA Wireless Health Institute
Sarah Meeker Jensen – FAIA, Founder of Jensen Partners Healthcare Planning

Politics

 Michael Dukakis – professor of policy studies, former governor of Massachusetts and 1988 presidential candidate
 Al Gore – visiting professor, 45th Vice President of the United States
 Larry Pressler – teacher and visiting fellow, former Senator from South Dakota

Science and technology

 George O. Abell (1927–1983) – professor of astronomy
 Asad Ali Abidi – professor of electrical engineering; pioneer of CMOS RF circuits; member of the National Academy of Engineering
 Margaret W. "Hap" Brennecke – NASA metallurgist
 M. C. Frank Chang – professor of electrical engineering; member of the National Academy of Engineering
 Alonzo Church – known for the lambda calculus used in computing
 Steven Clarke – professor of chemistry and biochemistry; pioneer in protein repair in aging (L-isoaspartyl methyltransferase)
 Vijay K. Dhir –  dean of the UCLA Henry Samueli School of Engineering and Applied Science; professor of mechanical and aerospace engineering
 François Diederich – professor of chemistry
 Paul Eggert - professor of computer science on
 David Eisenberg – professor of chemistry and biochemistry, and of biological chemistry; Director of the UCLA-DOE Institute for Genomics and Proteomics
 Sergio Ferrara – professor of physics; co-discovered supergravity in 1976
 Rajit Gadh – professor of mechanical and aerospace engineering; founder and director of UCLA Smart Grid Energy Research Center and Wireless Internet for Mobile Enterprise Consortium
 William Gelbart – professor of chemistry and biochemistry
 Andrea Ghez – professor of astronomy; expert in the galactic center and adaptive optics; Crafoord Prize recipient
 Sheila Greibach – professor of computer science, known for the Greibach normal form
 A. M. Harun-ar-Rashid, physicist; member, Nobel Committee for Physics
 Steve Horvath - professor of human genetics
 Kendall Houk – professor of chemistry
 Tatsuo Itoh – professor of electrical engineering; member of the National Academy of Engineering
 Michael E. Jung – professor of chemistry
 Richard Kaner – professor of chemistry
 Alan Kay – professor of computer science; Turing Award laureate
 John Kim – professor of mechanical and aerospace engineering; member of the National Academy of Engineering
 Margaret Kivelson – professor of space physics; expert in planetary magnetospheres; member of the National Academy of Sciences
 Leonard Kleinrock – professor of computer science; Internet pioneer; recipient of the 2007 National Medal of Science
 William Scott Klug – professor of mechanical and aerospace engineering; killed in the 2016 UCLA shooting
 Raphael David Levine – professor of chemistry
 Tung Hua Lin – professor of civil and environmental engineering; designer of China's first twin-engine aircraft
 Seymour Lubetzky – professor of library and information science
 Donald A. Martin – professor of mathematics and philosophy
 Mildred Esther Mathias – professor of botany (1962 – 1974), eponym of the campus' Mildred E. Mathias Botanical Garden
 Jordan Mendler - professor of applied statistics and quantitative economics
 William V. Mayer – professor of zoology
 Carlo Montemagno – Associate Director, California Nanosystems Institute; Founding Department Chair, Department of Biomedical Engineering; Carol and Roy Doumani Professor of Biomedical Engineering (2001-2006); Father of Bionanotechnology
 Stanley F. Nelson - processor of human genetics 
 Henry John Orchard – professor of electrical engineering; pioneer of the field of filter design
 Mangalore Anantha Pai – power engineer, Shanti Swarup Bhatnagar laureate
 Stott Parker - Professor of computer science 
 Judea Pearl – professor of computer science; pioneer of Bayesian networks and the probabilistic approach to artificial intelligence; Turing Award laureate
 Roberto Peccei – professor of physics; former dean of the UCLA Division of Physical Sciences; Sakurai Prize recipient
 Theodore M. Porter – professor of history of science
 Abraham Robinson – professor of mathematics and philosophy
 Leonard H. Rome - professor of biochemistry; former dean of the medical school
 Joseph Rudnick – professor of physics; former dean of the UCLA Division of Physical Sciences
 Amit Sahai - professor of computer science
 Arnold Scheibel - professor of psychiatry and neuroanatomy 
 Lloyd Shapley – professor of mathematics; known for the Shapley value in game theory
 Elizabeth Stern – professor of epidemiology
 Ernst G. Straus – professor of mathematics
 Terence Tao – professor of mathematics; Fields Medalist in 2006; Crafoord Prize recipient
 Sarah Tolbert – professor of chemistry
 Jean L. Turner – professor of astronomy and physics
 Edward Wright – professor of astronomy; expert in cosmology and infrared astronomy; member of the National Academy of Sciences
 Jeffrey Zink – professor of chemistry and biochemistry

Social science, arts and humanities

 Rogers Albritton – late professor of philosophy
 Perry Anderson - Marxist historian; professor emeritus of History and Sociology
 Carol Aneshensel - sociologist; professor and vice chair for the Department of Community Health Sciences in the School of Public Health
 Joyce Appleby – U.S. historian; specialist in intellectual history and the legacy of liberalism
 Ann Bergren – professor of Greek Literature, winner in 1988 of the University's Distinguished Teaching Award.
 William Bodiford – professor of Japanese and Buddhist studies
 Tyler Burge, Professor, Fellow, American Academy of Arts and Sciences
 Kenny Burrell – professor of jazz studies; jazz guitarist and composer
 Rudolf Carnap – late professor of the philosophy of language
 Alonzo Church – pioneer in the philosophy of language and computer science
 James Smoot Coleman – Africanist; founded the UCLA African Studies Center
 Brian Copenhaver – emeritus historian of philosophy
 Denis Cosgrove – Alexander von Humboldt Professor of Geography
 James Cuno – Director of the Grunwald Center for Graphic Arts at the Hammer Museum
 Angela Davis – assistant professor of philosophy, fired in 1969 by the Board of Regents and California Governor Ronald Reagan for her membership in the Communist Party
 Jared Diamond – professor of geography and physiology, Pulitzer Prize-winning author of Guns, Germs and Steel: The Fate of Human Societies
 Keith Donnellan – late professor of philosophy
 Frederick Erickson – professor emeritus of educational anthropology
 Kit Fine – former professor of philosophy
 Philippa Foot – late professor of philosophy
 Steven Forness – Professor of Psychiatry and Biobehavioral Sciences
 Andrea Fraser – professor of interdisciplinary studio
 Saul Friedländer – European historian; specialist in Holocaust studies
 Lukas Foss - late professor of music composition
 Lowell Gallagher – literary theorist 
 James Gimzewski – physicist and nanotechnology pioneer
 Carlo Ginzburg – European historian; pioneer of microhistory
 Juan Gómez-Quiñones – U.S. historian; specialist in Chicano history
 Lev Hakak – Professor of Hebrew Language and Literature at UCLA
 N. Katherine Hayles – literary critic
 Barbara Herman – professor of philosophy
 Thomas Hines – architectural historian; professor emeritus
 James N. Hill (1934–1997) – processualist archaeologist
 Darnell Hunt (PhD UCLA) – Professor of Sociology and African American Studies, Dean of Social Sciences
 Neil Peter Jampolis – professor of theater Design; Tony Award Winning Designer; Director and Designer of Theater, Dance, and Opera 
 Donald Kalish – late professor of philosophy
 Abraham Kaplan – late professor of philosophy
 David Kaplan – professor of the philosophy of language
 Edmond Keller – professor of political science; Africanist
 Harold Kelley (1921–2003) – professor of psychology; social psychologist
 Mark Kleiman – professor of public policy, expert on crime and drug policy
 Peter Kollock (1959–2009) – associate professor of sociology, specialist in collaboration and online participation in virtual communities
 Peter Ladefoged – professor of linguistics, specialist in phonetics
 Deborah Nadoolman Landis — professor of costume design; Oscar-nominated costume designer of Coming to America; founding director of the David C. Copley Center for Costume Design
 David Kellogg Lewis – former assistant professor of philosophy
 Barbara Kruger – professor of new genres, recipient of the Leone D’Or award from the Venice Biennale
 Ole Ivar Lovaas – professor of psychology, specialist in applied behavior analysis therapy for autism
 Michael Mann – professor of sociology; author of The Sources of Social Power volumes I and II
 Mwesa Isaiah Mapoma – Zambian musicologist
 Julián Marías – philosopher, opponent of Francisco Franco, author of History of Philosophy
 Thom Mayne – professor of architecture, architect, co-founder of firm named Morphosis
 Susan McClary – musicologist; prominent in the new-musicology movement; MacArthur Fellow; works have been translated into over twelve languages; wrote Feminine Endings: Music, Gender, and Sexuality
 Vasa Mihich – professor of design and media arts; artist and sculptor
 Richard Montague – late professor of philosophy
 Charles Moore – professor of architecture, author and architect, Beverly Hills Civic Center
 Richard Thacker Morris (1917–1981) – chairman of the sociology department, author
 Donald Neuen – professor of choral studies; conductor; apprentice of Robert Shaw
 Calvin Normore – professor of philosophy
 Karen Orren – professor of political science; noted for her work in American political development
 Catherine Opie – professor of photography and recipient of the Guggenheim Fellowship
 Terence Parsons – professor of philosophy
 John Perry – former professor of philosophy
 Lari Pittman – distinguished professor of painting 
 Hans Reichenbach – late professor of philosophy
 Amy Richlin – professor in Department of Classics
 Amy Rowat - Associate professor of biophysics and Marcie H. Rothman Presidential Chair in Food Studies
 Walter H. Rubsamen – professor of musicology
 Teofilo Ruiz – European historian; specialist in medieval history
 Bertrand Russell – former professor of philosophy; taught as a guest lecturer for one year
 David Schaberg – Dean of Humanities
 Arnold Schoenberg – professor of music; composer
 Seana Shiffrin – professor of philosophy and law known for her work in legal and moral philosophy
 Leo Smit - later professor in music
 Josef von Sternberg – taught film aesthetics
 Shelley Taylor – professor of psychology; social psychologist
 Dominic Thomas – chair of the department of French and Francophone Studies at UCLA
 Eugen Weber – historian; author of Peasants Into Frenchmen
 Luc E. Weber – Rector Emeritus of the University of Geneva
 Dixon Wecter – professor of English (1939 to 1945).
 Louis Jolyon West – professor of psychiatry; specialist in brainwashing
 Gerald Wilson – professor of ethnomusicology, jazz studies; jazz composer, arranger and musician
 Eugene Victor Wolfenstein – professor of political science; author of Psychoanalytic-Marxism: Groundwork
 Roy Bin Wong – professor of history; pioneer in modern Chinese economic history
 Medha Yodh – professor of classical Indian dance
 John Zaller – political scientist; author of The Nature and Origins of Mass Opinion
 Amy Zegart – professor of public policy and U.S. intelligence analyst; author of Spying Blind

Athletics

Athletic directors

Fred Cozens – Director of Physical Education and Athletics (1919–1942), first basketball (1919–1921) and football (1919) head coach
Dan Guerrero, B.A. 1974 – athletic director (2002–2020)
Martin Jarmond – athletic director (2020–present)
Wilbur Johns, 1925 – athletic director (1948–1963), men's basketball head coach (1939–1948), basketball player
J. D. Morgan – athletic director (1963–1979), head tennis coach (1949–1966), tennis player (1938–1941)

Basketball coaches

Steve Alford – men's basketball head coach (2013–2018)
Frank Arnold – men's basketball assistant coach (1971–1975)
Gene Bartow – men's basketball head coach (1975–1977)
Larry Brown – men's basketball head coach (1979–1981), member of the Basketball Hall of Fame
Tasha Butts – women's basketball assistant coach
Nikki Caldwell – women's basketball head coach (2008–2011)
Cori Close – women's basketball head coach (2011–present), women's basketball head coach (1993–1995)
Mick Cronin – men's basketball head coach (2019–present)
Denny Crum, 1958 – men's basketball assistant coach (1963–1971), player (1956–1958), member of the Basketball Hall of Fame
Gary Cunningham – men's basketball head coach (1977–1979), basketball player (1960–1962)
Donny Daniels – men's basketball assistant coach (2003–2010)
Larry Farmer – men's basketball head coach (1981–1984), basketball player (1970–1973)
Mark Gottfried – men's basketball assistant coach (1987–1995)
Jim Harrick – men's basketball head coach (1988–1996)
Walt Hazzard – men's basketball head coach (1984–1988), basketball player (1961–1964), NBA and Olympic player
Jack Hirsch – men's basketball assistant coach (1984–1988), player (1961–1964)
Brad Holland, B.A. 1979 – men's basketball assistant coach (1988–1992), player (1975–1979)
Michael Holton – men's basketball assistant coach (1996–2001), player (1979–1983)
Ben Howland – men's basketball head coach (2003–2013); 2006 Pac-10 Coach of the Year
Chad Kammerer – men's basketball assistant coach
Kerry Keating – men's basketball assistant coach (2003–2007)
Steve Lavin – men's basketball head coach (1996–2003)
Gerald Madkins – men's basketball assistant coach, player
Philip Mathews – men's basketball assistant coach (2010–2013)
Billie Moore – women's basketball head coach (1977–1993), member of the Basketball Hall of Fame
Kevin O'Connor – men's basketball assistant coach (1979–1984)
Kathy Olivier – women's basketball head coach (1993–2008), women's basketball head coach (1986–1993)
Lorenzo Romar – men's basketball assistant coach (1992–1996)
Jim Saia – men's basketball assistant coach (1996–2003)
Ivo Simović – men's basketball assistant coach (2022–present)
Kenny Washington – first women's basketball head coach (1974), basketball player (1963–1966)
Greg White – men's basketball assistant coach (1995–1996)
Sidney Wicks – men's basketball assistant coach (1984–1988), player (1968–1971)
John Wooden – men's basketball head coach (1948–1975), won 10 NCAA championships, member of the Basketball Hall of Fame as both a player and coach
Caddy Works – men's basketball head coach (1921–1939)
Ernie Zeigler – men's basketball assistant coach (2003–2006)

Football coaches

Sal Alosi – strength and conditioning coordinator
Jerry Azzinaro – defensive coordinator (2018–2021)
Dino Babers – assistant head coach (2004–2007)
William F. Barnes – head football coach (1958–1964)
Eric Bieniemy – running backs coach (2003–2005)
Gary Blackney – assistant coach (1978–1979)
Sam Boghosian – assistant coach (1957–1964), player (1952–1954)
Tom Bradley – defensive coordinator (2015–2017)
James J. Cline – head football coach (1923–1924)
George W. Dickerson – interim head football coach (1958)
Terry Donahue – head football coach (1976–1995), football player (1965–1966), member of the College Football Hall of Fame
Karl Dorrell – head football coach (2003–2007), football player (1983–1986)
Justin Frye – offensive line coach (2018–2021), offensive coordinator (2019–2021)
Edwin C. Horrell – head football coach (1939–1944), member of the College Football Hall of Fame
Mike Johnson – interim head coach (2011)
Chip Kelly – head football coach (2018-present), former NFL coach
Ed Kezirian – interim head football coach (2002), football player
Adrian Klemm – run game coordinator and offensive line coach
Bert LaBrucherie, 1929 – head football coach (1945–1948), football player (1926–1928)
Demetrice Martin – defensive backs coach
Noel Mazzone – offensive coordinator (2012-2015)
Bill McGovern – defensive coordinator (2022–present)
Jim L. Mora – head football coach (2012–2017)
Rick Neuheisel, B.A. 1984 – head football coach (2008–2011), football player (1980–1983)
Kennedy Polamalu – running backs coach
Tommy Prothro – head football coach (1965–1970), member of the College Football Hall of Fame
Pepper Rodgers – head football coach (1971–1973)
Henry Russell Sanders – head football coach (1949–1957)
Lou Spanos – defensive coordinator (2012–2013)
William H. Spaulding – head football coach (1925–1938)
Bob Toledo – head football coach (1996–2002)
Harry Trotter – head football coach (1920–1922), track coach (1919–1946)
Jeff Ulbrich – assistant head coach
Dick Vermeil – head football coach (1974–1975)
DeWayne Walker – interim head football coach (2007)
Eric Yarber – wide receivers coach

Miscellaneous coaches

 Elvin C. Drake – head sports trainer, 1942–1972; head track and field coach, 1947–1964, winning the NCAA championship in 1956; coached decathletes Rafer Johnson and Yang Chuan-kwang during the 1960 Summer Olympics, in which they won the gold and silver medals; UCLA's Drake Stadium named in his honor
 Adam Krikorian – men's and women's water polo coach, won nine NCAA championships; assistant coach, won one NCAA championship; UCLA water polo player, won 1995 NCAA championship
 Al Scates – men's volleyball coach, won 19 NCAA championships
 John Smith – track and field coach, inventor of the drive phase and world record holder at  event

See also

 List of people from Los Angeles

References

University of California, Los Angeles people
Los Angeles people